The Adventures of Pinocchio is an 1883 novel by Carlo Collodi.

The Adventures of Pinocchio may also refer to:

Film and TV
 The Adventures of Pinocchio (unfinished film), an Italian animated feature film intended for release in 1936
 The Adventures of Pinocchio (1972 miniseries), an Italian miniseries
 The Adventures of Pinocchio (1972 film), an animated adaptation from Cartoons Cinematografica Italiana
 Pinocchio: The Series or Saban's Adventures of Pinocchio, a 1972 Japanese TV series
 Piccolino no Bōken  or The Adventures of Pinocchio, a 1976 Japanese/German TV series
 The Adventures of Pinocchio (1996 film) a live-action British adaptation from Steve Barron

Music
 The Adventures of Pinocchio (opera), a 2007 English-language opera by Jonathan Dove
 The Adventures of Pinocchio, a 2009 stage work by Lior Navok

See also
 The New Adventures of Pinocchio (disambiguation)
 Pinocchio (1940 film)
 Pinocchio (disambiguation)